Asseco Resovia Rzeszów 2015–2016 season is the 2015/2016 volleyball season for Polish professional volleyball club Asseco Resovia Rzeszów.

The club competes in:
 Polish Championship
 Polish Cup
 Polish SuperCup
 CEV Champions League

Team Roster Season 2015-2016
Head coach:  Andrzej Kowal

Squad changes for the 2014–2015 season
In:

Out:

Most Valuable Players

PlusLiga

General classification

Results, schedules and standings

2015 Polish SuperCup

2015–16 PlusLiga

Regular season

Final round (for gold medal)

2015–16 Polish Cup

Quarterfinal

Semifinal

2015–16 CEV Champions League

Pool G

Final Four

References

Resovia (volleyball) seasons